All Ceylon Tamil Congress, is the oldest Tamil political party in Sri Lanka.

History
The ACTC was founded in 1944 by G.G. Ponnambalam. Ponnambalam asked for a 50-50 representation in parliament (50% for the Sinhalese, 50% for all other ethnic groups). This was immediately rejected by the British Governor General Lord Soulbury as a "mockery of democracy".

Due to the cooperation of the  ACTC with the United National Party a group led by S.J.V. Chelvanayakam broke away in 1949, forming the Federal Party (FP). The ACTC was largely discredited when their ally the UNP moved away from bilingual and bicommunal policies towards a pro-Sinhalese stance. Thus the FP emerged as the major Tamil party in 1956.

In 1972 the ACTC and the FP formed the Tamil United Front, which later evolved into the Tamil United Liberation Front in 1976.

Ahead of the 2001 elections, ACTC joined the LTTE-backed Tamil National Alliance (TNA). In the 2004 elections the TNA won 6.9% of the popular vote and 22 out of the 225 seats in parliament.

The ACTC left the TNA in 2010 and subsequently joined a new political alliance, the Tamil National People's Front.

Leaders
Leaders of this party:
 G. G. Ponnambalam (Snr.)
 Kumar Ponnambalam
 Dr. Nalliah Kumaraguruparan
 A. Vinayagamoorthy
 Gajendrakumar Ponnambalam

1947 Parliamentary General Election
In the 1947 election, the first for the independent Ceylon, the ACTC won 4.37% of the popular vote and 7 out of 95 seats in the Sri Lankan parliament.

Votes and seats won by ACTC by electoral district

1952 Parliamentary General Election
In the 1952 election the ACTC won 2.77% of the popular vote and 4 out of 95 seats in the Sri Lankan parliament.

Votes and seats won by ACTC by electoral district

1956 Parliamentary General Election
In the 1956 election the ACTC fielded only one candidate, party leader G.G. Ponnambalam in Jaffna, who managed to win the seat with 8,914 votes.

1960 (March) Parliamentary General Election
In the March 1960 election the ACTC won 1.32% of the popular vote and 1 out of 151 seats in the Sri Lankan parliament.

Votes and seats won by ACTC by electoral district

1960 (July) Parliamentary General Election
In the July 1960 election the ACTC won 1.66% of the popular vote and 1 out of 151 seats in the Sri Lankan parliament.

1965 Parliamentary General Election
In the 1965 election the ACTC won 2.44% of the popular vote and 3 out of 151 seats in the Sri Lankan parliament.

Votes and seats won by ACTC by electoral district

1970 Parliamentary General Election
In the 1970 election the ACTC won 2.32% of the popular vote and 3 out of 151 seats in the Sri Lankan parliament.

Votes and seats won by ACTC by electoral district

2000 Parliamentary General Election
In the 2000 election the ACTC won 0.32% of the popular vote and 1 out of 225 seats in the Sri Lankan parliament.

Votes and seats won by ACTC by electoral district

2001 Parliamentary General Election

2004 Parliamentary General Election

2010 Parliamentary General Election

References

 
1944 establishments in Ceylon
Ceylon in World War II
Political parties established in 1944
Political parties in Sri Lanka
Sri Lankan Tamil nationalist parties